Eberhard Melchior (born 12 November 1912) was a German mathematician who provided the first proof of Sylvester's line problem in 1940. He also discovered the related inequality now named after him.

Melchior was born in Dresden on 12 November 1912. He studied at the University of Göttingen and at the Dresden Technical University (TH Dresden). He obtained his Ph.D. at Berlin University on 2 June 1937 with a thesis on a problem on the theory of configurations advised by Ludwig Bieberbach.

References

1912 births
Possibly living people
20th-century German mathematicians